Ani Etgabaer  is 1970 Hebrew novel by Israeli author Dvora Omer. The book's plot line follows the path of a young girl with cerebral palsy, Gila, as she grows up. It shows her struggles through childhood, adolescent, and beyond.

References

External links 
 
 Simani 

20th-century Israeli novels
1970 novels
Novels set in Israel